Csaba Bukta (born 25 July 2001) is a Hungarian professional footballer who plays as a forward for Austrian Bundesliga club Rheindorf Altach. He also represents the Hungary U17 national team.

Honours
Red Bull Salzburg Youth
Jugendliga U18: 2019

References

External links 

2001 births
People from Törökszentmiklós
Living people
Association football forwards
Hungarian footballers
Hungary youth international footballers
FC Red Bull Salzburg players
SC Rheindorf Altach players
2. Liga (Austria) players
Austrian Football Bundesliga players
Sportspeople from Jász-Nagykun-Szolnok County